Ghagwal is a town and Panchayat in Samba district in the Jammu division of the Indian union territory of Jammu and Kashmir. The town is located 15 kilometres from district headquarters Samba. River Baein flows from east side of Ghagwal. Famous 1750 years old, Narsingh Dham Mandir is situated in Middle of Ghagwal and is also known as "Heart of Ghagwal". Before 2006 Ghagwal was part of Kathua District of Jammu Division. Ghagwal Town is Also Headquarter of Tehsil and Sub Division Office of Ghagwal. Govt. Degree College, Ghagwal is currently functional in Temporary Building.

Demographics
According to the 2011 census of India, Ghagwal has 312 households. The literacy rate of Ghagwal village was 83.56% compared to 67.16% of Jammu and Kashmir. In Kalarooch, Male literacy stands at 91.72% while the female literacy rate was 75.08%.

Transport

Road
Ghagwal is connected to other places in Jammu and Kashmir and India by the Srinagar-Kanyakumari Highway NH-44 .

Rail
The nearest railway station to Ghagwal is the Ghagwal railway station located in the village.

Air
The nearest airport is Jammu Airport located at a distance of 45 kilometres and is a 1-hour drive.

See also
Jammu and Kashmir
Samba district
Samba

References

Villages in Samba district